A list of French-produced films scheduled for release in 2019.

Films

Notes

External links
 French films of 2019 at the Internet Movie Database

French
2019
Films